Radava is a village and municipality in the Nové Zámky District in the Nitra Region of south-west Slovakia.

History
In historical records the village was first mentioned in 1237.

Geography
The municipality lies at an altitude of 151 meters and covers an area of 7.599 km². It has a population of about 850 people.

Ethnicity
The population is nearly 100% Slovak.

Facilities
The village has a small public library, a gym and a football pitch.

External links
 
 
http://www.statistics.sk/mosmis/eng/run.html
Radava – Nové Zámky Okolie

Villages and municipalities in Nové Zámky District